Lighter Shade of Brown is the fourth studio album by A Lighter Shade of Brown. It was released on November 18, 1997 through Greenside/Thump Records. Production was handled by Ali Malek, Jammin' James Carter and Lev Berlak, with Andy Herrara and Antonio Mendoza as executive producers. It features guest appearances from Shiro, D'wayne Wiggins, Rappin' 4-Tay and Teardrop.

Track listing
"Welcome to Club Fed"- 1:00
"Club Fed"- 3:57
"Street Life"- 4:17
"Interlude"- 1:48
"Do U Wanna Ride (Hey Buddy Hey Buddy)"- 3:34
"It's on Tonight"- 3:24
"They Can't Stand It"- 4:02 (featuring Shiro and Teardrop)
"Whatever You Want"- 4:00 (featuring Tony! Toni! Toné!)
"Bounce"- 4:09
"So What You Say"- 3:48
"Klsob Request Line"- 0:53
"Can't Hold Back"- 4:16 (featuring Shiro)
"World Famous"- 3:36 (featuring Rappin' 4-Tay)

References

External links

1997 albums
A Lighter Shade of Brown albums